Gary Richard Lowe (May 4, 1934 - October 8, 2017) was an American football defensive back.  He played in the National Football League (NFL) for the Washington Redskins and the Detroit Lions.  He played college football at Michigan State University and was drafted in the fifth round of the 1956 NFL Draft. He died on October 8, 2017, at the age of 83.

References

1934 births
2017 deaths
American football defensive backs
Detroit Lions players
Michigan State Spartans football players
Washington Redskins players
People from Trenton, Michigan
Players of American football from Michigan
Sportspeople from Wayne County, Michigan